The men's individual nordic combined competition for the 1988 Winter Olympics in Calgary at Canada Olympic Park and Canmore Nordic Centre on 27 and 28 February.

This was the first individual event that used the Gundersen system, using a pursuit cross-country race, with the time gaps for the pursuit determined by the point differences in the ski jumping.

Results

Ski Jumping

Athletes did three normal hill ski jumps, with the lowest score dropped. The combined points earned on the jumps determined the starting order and times for the cross-country race; each three points was equal to a 20-second deficit.

Cross-Country

The cross-country race was over a distance of 15 kilometres.

References

Nordic combined at the 1988 Winter Olympics